The Tigray Independence Party (TIP) is a Tigrayan nationalist political party in Ethiopia. Founded in 2020, the party seeks the independence of the Tigray Region.

Creation
In September 2020, BBC News described Tigray Independence Party as "a new opposition party".

Policies
In September 2020, prior to the 2020 Tigray regional election held that month, TIP's main aim was for Tigray to secede from Ethiopia, becoming independent. It described Ethiopia as an "empire".

September 2020 election
TIP won 18,479 votes out of the 2,633,848 votes cast, winning no seats in the September 2020 election. The Tigray Regional Council resulting from the election established a mechanism for minority parties to propose agendas and bills, present motions, propose policy and nominate appointees. TIP was allotted five seats.

Tigray War
On 2 February 2021, TIP, together with National Congress of Great Tigray and Salsay Weyane Tigray, estimated there to have been 52,000 civilian casualties of the Tigray War.

References

Ethnic political parties in Ethiopia
Political parties in Ethiopia
2020 establishments in Tigray